This is a list of tallest buildings in the Baltic States, which includes all the buildings in Estonia, Latvia, and Lithuania with heights that exceeds 64 m (210 ft); TV towers and chimneys are excluded in the height measurement.

There are 43 Lithuanian, 28 Latvian and 17 Estonian buildings on this list.

Completed buildings

Under construction 
This table lists buildings that are under construction in the Baltic states and are planned to rise at least .

On hold 
This table lists buildings that are on hold in the Baltic states and are planned to rise at least .

Proposed 
This table lists buildings that are proposed in the Baltic states and are planned to rise at least .

See also
 List of tallest buildings in Estonia
 List of tallest buildings in Latvia
 List of tallest buildings in Lithuania
 List of tallest buildings in the European Union
 List of tallest buildings in Europe

References

Baltic states
Baltic states-related lists
Lists of buildings and structures in Estonia
Lists of buildings and structures in Latvia
Lists of buildings and structures in Lithuania